Stelis quinquenervia is a species of orchid endemic to western South America.

quinquenervia